Huia Publishers (HUIA) is a book publishing company based in Wellington, New Zealand established in 1991.  HUIA publish material in Māori language and English for adults and children.  

HUIA was founded by Robyn Rangihuia Bargh (CNZM) and her husband Brian Bargh. Bargh won the inaugural Te Tohu Toi Ke a Te Waka Toi award from Creative New Zealand in 2006 for 'making a difference in the literary sector.'

Along with the Māori Literature Trust, HUIA have run the Te Papa Tupu programme that supports Māori writers to develop their skills.

In 2022 the Aotearoa New Zealand Festival programmed an event Thirty Years of HUIA with current directors of HUIA, Eboni Waitere (Ngāti Kahungunu, Rangitāne) and Brian Morris (Ngāti Kahungunu, Rongowhakaata) and co-founder Robyn Bargh.

References

External links
HUIA website

Book publishing companies of New Zealand